Ovalina is a genus of minute sea snails, pyramidellid gastropod mollusks or micromollusks in the family Pyramidellidae within the tribe Chrysallidini.

Species
 Ovalina brevisculpta Peñas & Rolán, 2017
 Ovalina circumventa Peñas & Rolán, 2017
 Ovalina corrotata Peñas & Rolán, 2017
 Ovalina delenita Peñas & Rolán, 2017
 Ovalina flexisculpta Peñas & Rolán, 2017
 Ovalina piriformis Peñas & Rolán, 2017

References

 Peñas A. & Rolán E. (2017). Deep water Pyramidelloidea from the central and South Pacific. The tribe Chrysallidini. ECIMAT (Estación de Ciencias Mariñas de Toralla), Universidade de Vigo. 412 pp.

External links
 

Pyramidellidae